U-Wei Haji Saari is a Malaysian film director. He first gained international attention with The Arsonist (more known by its Malay name Kaki Bakar), the first Malaysian film to enter the Cannes Film Festival in 1995.

Career

Director
He began his career as a director for television dramas until 1996, when he made his film debut with the highly controversial Perempuan, Isteri dan..., which won him the Best Director award at the 11th Malaysia Film Festival.

In 2014, U-Wei produced a period film titled Hanyut as a co-production between countries Indonesia, Malaysia, and Australia. The film is based on a Joseph Conrad's novel titled Almayer's Folly, which tells about the life of the Malay community in the 19th century.

Filmography

Film

References

An article in the sun
http://www.sun2surf.com/article.cfm?id=57617

External links
 

Malaysian film directors
Malaysian screenwriters
Living people
People from Pahang
Malaysian people of Malay descent
Malaysian people of Indonesian descent
Malaysian people of Minangkabau descent
Malay-language film directors
1954 births